Ricardo Pérez Manrique (born 17 May 1947) is a Uruguayan lawyer and judge.

Since 2012 he is a member of the Supreme Court of Justice.

Publications
 Código de la Infancia y la Adolescencia, comentado y anotado (with Jacinta Balbela)
 Reflexiones sobre la Ley de Seguridad Ciudadana (with Milton Cairoli)

References

1947 births
20th-century Uruguayan judges
21st-century Uruguayan judges
Supreme Court of Uruguay justices
Living people